The Treaty of Tangier was signed in Tangier on 10 September 1844, whereby the Franco-Moroccan War was ended and Morocco officially recognised Algeria as a French possession.

Just after the Moroccan defeat at the Battle of Isly on 14 August 1844, Moroccan troops, allied with Abd al-Qadir, were attacked by general Thomas Robert Bugeaud at Wadi Isly. Not far from the French Algerian border, the 11,000 French troops routed the 20,000 to 25,000 Moroccan horsemen.

The sultan Abd al-Rahman's support for Emir Abd al-Qadir led to the French bombarding Tangier and occupying Mogador. A month later, the Treaty of Tangier was signed on 10 September 1844, ending the war, in which Morocco recognised Algeria as a French possession.

See also 
List of treaties
Abd al-Rahman of Morocco
Emir Abd al-Qadir
Battle of Isly

References

External links
World History 1840 - 1850 AD
Chronology: The July Monarchy (1830 - 1848)

Tangiers
History of Tangier
1844 in France
1844 treaties
Tangiers
France–Morocco relations